

ARA Cabo San Antonio (Q-42) was a tank landing ship in the Argentine Navy, built in Argentina at AFNE, Río Santiago shipyard. She was launched on 20 July 1968. Cabo San Antonio was based on the US Navy's De Soto County-class tank landing ship design.

History 

The high point of her career was the Argentine invasion of the Falkland Islands (Malvinas) in 1982, as part of Operation Azul.  Cabo San Antonio disembarked with 20 LVTP-7 tracked amphibious armoured personnel carriers and LARC-V transports from the 1st Amphibious Vehicles Battalion, carrying D and E Companies of the 2nd Marine Infantry Battalion at Yorke Bay. She did not participate further in the Falklands War once the Argentinian landings finished.

Cabo San Antonio was decommissioned in 1997.

References
 pictorial and history

See also 
 List of ships of the Argentine Navy

Tank landing ships
Ships built in Argentina
Falklands War naval ships of Argentina
De Soto County-class tank landing ships of the Argentine Navy
1968 ships